The French Basketball Academy (French: Académie du basket-ball français) is a hall of fame that honors individuals (or whole teams) that have contributed to the spread and improvement of French basketball, through their sporting contributions, and their actions in support of the game in France. Inductees are chosen by the Hall's Honorary committee. It was founded in 2004.

Honorary committee

Inductees

See also
College Basketball Hall of Fame
Basketball Hall of Fame
 List of members of the Naismith Memorial Basketball Hall of Fame
 List of players in the Naismith Memorial Basketball Hall of Fame
 List of coaches in the Naismith Memorial Basketball Hall of Fame
FIBA Hall of Fame
 List of members of the FIBA Hall of Fame
EuroLeague Hall of Fame
Italian Basketball Hall of Fame
Greek Basket League Hall of Fame
VTB United League Hall of Fame
Finnish Basketball Hall of Fame
Australian Basketball Hall of Fame
Philippine Basketball Association Hall of Fame
Women's Basketball Hall of Fame

References

External links
French Basketball Federation Official Site 

Basketball in France
European basketball awards
Basketball museums and halls of fame
Halls of fame in France